Bosworthia is a genus of branching photosynthetic alga known from the Middle Cambrian Burgess Shale. 20 specimens of Bosworthia are known from the Greater Phyllopod bed, where they comprise 0.04% of the community.  One of its two original species has since been reassigned to Walcottophycus.

References

External links 
 

Burgess Shale fossils
Red algae genera

Cambrian genus extinctions